Žugaj is a surname. Notable people with the surname include:

Nenad Žugaj (born 1983), Croatian wrestler
Neven Žugaj (born 1983), Croatian wrestler, twin brother of Nenad

See also
Ryszard Żugaj (born 1957), Polish swimmer